Janusz Kiszka (born 1600 in Krzywicze (today Belarus) – 1653) was a Polish politician and magnate in the 17th century Polish–Lithuanian Commonwealth. Last of the Kiszka family. Royal Rotmistrz, starosta of Parnawa from 1610, Voivode of Polock since 1621, Field Lithuanian Hetman since 1635, Great Lithuanian Hetman since 1646.

Raised a Calvinist, he converted with his father and brothers to Roman Catholicism in 1606. Unlike his siblings, he was quite tolerant of his former co-religionists, also because his wife was a Calvinist too.

He married Krystyna Drucka-Sokolińska, and had no heirs.

References

1600 births
1653 deaths
17th-century Polish nobility
Polish Calvinist and Reformed Christians
Converts to Roman Catholicism from Calvinism
Polish Roman Catholics
Polish people of the Polish–Muscovite War (1605–1618)
Janusz
Field Hetmans of the Grand Duchy of Lithuania
Great Hetmans of the Grand Duchy of Lithuania